Luca Congi (born June 15, 1983) is a former professional Canadian football punter/placekicker. He was drafted 12th overall by the Saskatchewan Roughriders in the 2006 CFL Draft. He played CIS football at Simon Fraser University for the Simon Fraser Clan.

Professional career

Saskatchewan Roughriders
Congi was drafted out of college by Saskatchewan (12th overall) in 2006, and he won the position of punter/placekicker in training camp. He replaced the Roughriders longtime franchise kicker Paul McCallum, who left Saskatchewan to join the BC Lions as a free agent in 2006. After the 2007 season, Congi was no longer the primary punter for Saskatchewan, with that role going to Jamie Boreham followed by Louie Sakoda in 2010. Instead, he handled all of Saskatchewan's placekicking duties. He was released following the 2011 season after Congi spent most of that season recuperating from injury while Christopher Milo filled in for him and ultimately replaced him. 

His unorthodox kicking habit has been noticed by many sportscasters.  When he kicks the ball for a field goal, he does not look at where it is going, but instead looks at the ground only to look up when the ball is through the uprights.

Hamilton Tiger-Cats
He was signed by the Hamilton Tiger-Cats on March 23, 2012. He played two seasons for the Tiger-Cats before quitting the team February 2014 in the wake of the team's re-signing of Justin Medlock, who had also been the Tiger-Cats' kicker before Congi's arrival.

Edmonton Eskimos
On September 8, 2014, Congi signed with the Edmonton Eskimos.

Congi signed a one-day contract on June 27, 2016 to retire as a member of the Saskatchewan Roughriders.

References

External links 
 Edmonton Eskimos Profile

1983 births
Living people
Canadian football placekickers
Canadian football punters
Canadian people of Italian descent
Edmonton Elks players
Hamilton Tiger-Cats players
Sportspeople from Waterloo, Ontario
Players of Canadian football from Ontario
Saskatchewan Roughriders players
Simon Fraser Clan football players
Simon Fraser University alumni